Rosemiro Correia de Souza (born 22 February 1954), known as Rosemiro, is a Brazilian footballer who played as a right-back. He competed in the men's tournament at the 1976 Summer Olympics and won a gold medal in football at the 1975 Pan American Games.

References

External links
 
 

Living people
1954 births
Sportspeople from Belém
Brazilian footballers
Association football fullbacks
Brazil international footballers
Olympic footballers of Brazil
Footballers at the 1976 Summer Olympics
Pan American Games gold medalists for Brazil
Pan American Games medalists in football
Footballers at the 1975 Pan American Games
Medalists at the 1975 Pan American Games